"Sad" is a song by English musician Elton John and Australian electronic dance duo Pnau. It was released in the United Kingdom on 20 July 2012 as the second and final single from the album Good Morning to the Night. In November 2012, John and Pnau performed the song live on The X Factor Australia.

The song incorporates elements from the following original Elton John sound recordings: "Nice and Slow", "Crazy Water", "Curtains", "Sorry Seems to Be the Hardest Word" and "Friends".

Track listings
"Sad" – 3:21
"Sad" (The 2 Bears Remix) – 9:01

Charts

Release history

References

2012 songs
2012 singles
Elton John songs
Pnau songs
Songs with music by Elton John
Mercury Records singles